Ilya Andreyevich Polikutin (born 11 September 1994) is a Russian football player.

Club career
He made his debut in the Russian Football National League for FC Kuban Krasnodar on 31 July 2021 in a game against FC Spartak-2 Moscow.

References

External links
 
 
 Profile by Russian Football National League

1994 births
Sportspeople from Krasnodar
Living people
Russian footballers
Association football defenders
FC Kuban Krasnodar players
FC Urozhay Krasnodar players
FC Metallurg Lipetsk players
Russian Second League players
Russian First League players